The Canton of Aytré is a canton of the Charente-Maritime département, in France. After the French canton reorganisation which came into effect in March 2015, the canton was expanded from 3 to 4 communes:
Aytré  
Dompierre-sur-Mer
Périgny
Puilboreau

Population history

See also 
 Cantons of the Charente-Maritime department

References

Cantons of Charente-Maritime